Mahuwa may refer to the following places in Nepal:

 Mahuwa, Kapilvastu, in Lumbini
 Mahuwa (Pra. Ko), in Dhanusha, Janakpur
 Mahuwa (Pra. Khe), in Dhanusha, Janakpur

See also 
 Mahuva (disambiguation), places in Gujarat, western India
 Mahwa (disambiguation)